Being Victor was a web and television series set in Glasgow, Scotland. It was produced by Shed Media Scotland.

Synopsis

Vinnie Dupe (Dean Smith) is seventeen years old, and he’s doing his Highers at Queen Mary’s College in Glasgow, Scotland. He used to get a hard time at school, but college isn’t too bad, and Vinnie has an active online life to keep him busy, blogging as his witty, scathing alter ego as "Victor Sage".

Vinnie’s best friends are Eva and Doyle. It’s always been the three of them, a slightly goofy clique happy to hover round the edges of cool. But nothing stays the same forever, and things are about to change as Eva starts dating Danny Burton (Sam Robertson), college goldenboy and Vinnie's tormenter. Vinnie is determined to split them up and uses his blog to interfere in his friends' lives with some dire consequences.

Release

Being Victor was first released via the internet by MTV UK on 7 September 2010 in a 20-episode form, each up to 10 minutes in length. STV had then broadcast the series on television from 5 October 2010, re-edited into 6 episodes running at approximately 25 minutes.

Victor's blog and Twitter account went live July 2010, prior to the release of the show.

Production

The commission was awarded by CTVC in June/July 2009 to Shed Media Scotland, who developed and produced the concept. The project was then match-funded by the Digital Media IP Fund (jointly financed by the Creative Scotland Innovation Fund and Scottish Enterprise) in August 2009.

The series featured music by: Pooch, X-Lion Tamer, Miniature Dinosaurs, MandaRin, Kochka, Found, Fangs, Cancel the Astronauts and Any Colour Black.

Articles
Shed Wins Online Drama Commission
MTV Press Release for Being Victor
Creative Scotland-supported digital drama to debut on MTV
STV Press Release
Being Victor in Roughcuts magazine

External links

Being Victor on TrueTube

2010 British television series debuts
Internet soap operas
2010s teen drama television series
British drama web series
Television series by Warner Bros. Television Studios